Daniel Metge (born December 17, 1970 in Sainte-Colombe les Vienne, France) is a French screenwriter and film director.

Filmography

Director 
 2008 : Ciels de traîne short film with Michael Lonsdale, Lila Redouane, Julie Durand
 2010 : Ornières (Rust) short film with Serge Riaboukine, Lila Redouane, Daniel Metge
 2011 : Mon amoureux (My sweetheart) Short film with Salomé Stévenin, Miss Ming, Grégory Givernaud
 2013 : Poussières (Dusts) Short film with Salomé Stévenin, Serge Riaboukine, Nicolas Giraud, Jenny Bellay, Bruno Henry

Awards 

 2012 : My sweetheart : Prix Louis le Prince award, Leeds International Film Festival 
 2012 : My sweetheart : Reflet d'or award, Geneva International Film Festival Tous écrans 
 2012 : My sweetheart : Best short film award, Französische Filmtage Tübingen Stuttgart 
 2012 : My sweetheart : Golden Unicorn for Best international short film award, Alpinale Short Film Festival (Nenzing, Austria) 
 2012 : My sweetheart : Prix France Télévision du Court métrage, Clermont-Ferrand Short Film Festival 
 2012 : My sweetheart : Best performance in a live action short for Miss Ming, Toronto International Short Film Festival  
 2013 : My sweetheart : Short film special mention, Los Angeles Colcoa Short Film Competition 
 2015 : Dusts : GreenFlicks Award for Best Environmental Short Film, Sydney Flickerfest International Short Film Festival

External links
 
 Daniel Metge on Unifrance
 Daniel Metge on Bluemonday

French screenwriters
French directors
1970 births
Living people